William A. Young Jr (May 20, 1914 – January 21, 1994) was an American football player and coach.  He played a lineman in the National Football League (NFL) for the Washington Redskins.  Young served as the head football coach of Furman University from 1950 to 1954.

Early life
Young was born in North Little Rock, Arkansas and attended North Little Rock High School.

College career
Young attended and played college football at the University of Alabama.  As a sophomore in 1934, he helped the Crimson Tide finish the season with a perfect record (10–0 overall, 7–0 in the SEC), as Southeastern Conference champions for the second consecutive season and as national champions after they defeated Stanford in the Rose Bowl.  Alabama was selected national champion in 1934 by Dunkel, Houlgate, Poling System and Williamson.  Sportswriter Morgan Blake called it the best football team he ever saw.

Professional career

Player
After going undrafted in 1937, Young was signed by the Washington Redskins.  During his rookie season, the Redskins won their first league championship, the 1937 NFL Championship Game, on December 12, 1937, against the Chicago Bears, their first year in D.C. The Redskins then met the Bears again in the 1940 NFL Championship Game on December 8, 1940. The result, 73–0 in favor of the Bears, is still the worst one-sided loss in NFL history.  Young then played in his third championship game, the 1942 NFL Championship on December 13, 1942, where the Redskins won their second championship, 14–6.

Young left the team on January 8, 1943, and enlisted in the United States Navy as a chief specialist during World War II.

Coach
Young was the head coach for the Furman University football team from 1950 to 1954.

Personal
Young died on January 21, 1994, in Jacksonville, Florida.

Head coaching record

References

External links
 
 

1914 births
1994 deaths
American football tackles
Alabama Crimson Tide football players
Furman Paladins athletic directors
Furman Paladins football coaches
Washington Redskins players
People from North Little Rock, Arkansas
Players of American football from Arkansas
United States Navy personnel of World War II
United States Navy sailors